M. S. Ramaiah Medical College (MSRMC), now renamed as Ramaiah Medical College (RMC), is a tertiary health care center and a medical college situated in Bangalore, Karnataka. The Ramaiah Medical College (RMC) was established in 1979  by the Gokula Education Foundation and was founded by the Late Sri. M S Ramaiah. It is an autonomous institute and affiliated with the Rajiv Gandhi University of Health Sciences, Jayanagar, Bangalore.

The MS Ramaiah Medical College was founded by the Late Sri Mathikere Sampangi Ramaiah in 1979 and as a requisite for medical education, the M. S. Ramaiah Teaching Hospital was founded. With a vision of a multi-speciality centre, the M. S. Ramaiah Institute of Nephro–Urology, M. S. Ramaiah Institute of Oncology and M. S. Ramaiah Institute of Cardiology was set up; the founding of M. S. Ramaiah Medical Teaching Hospital was done in the year 1985.
The MS Ramaiah Medical College is thus now a part of the MSR Group of Institutions.

Rankings 

MSRMC was ranked 27th among medical colleges in India in 2020 by India Today.

Campus & facilities 
The campus occupies a spacious area of 65 acres and provides various facilities to students like:

 Library 
 Hostel 
 Laboratories
 Cafetaria 
 Sports Complex 
 Counselling Cell 
 Auditorium 
 Security facility including students tracking system

References

External links
 

Colleges in Bangalore
Medical colleges in Karnataka
Private schools in Bangalore
Colleges affiliated to Rajiv Gandhi University of Health Sciences
Educational institutions in India with year of establishment missing